Agom Jarigbe (born December 9, 1970) hails from Ibil in Ogoja Local Government Area of Cross River State. He is a  politician, currently a member of the Senate in Nigeria's 9th National Assembly representing Cross River North and was a member of the House of Representatives in the 8th and 9th National Assembly representing Ogoja/Yala Federal Constituency. Agom Jarigbe was elected into the Green Chamber in 2015 and has served for his second term in office. 

In 2020 he contested and won the Cross River North Senatorial bye election. However, it was given to another candidate. In 2021, the Supreme Court had judgement in his favour and upheld him as the senator-elect for Cross River North. He recontested the 2023 senatorial election and was reelected under the Peoples Democratic Party (PDP).

Education 
Agom Jarigbe attended the School of Basic studies in PortHarcourt, Rivers state, where he passed the West African Senior Secondary Certificate Examination (WASSCE) in 1990. He obtained a bachelors degree in Chemistry from the University of Calabar, Cross River State in 2004. He is presently studying Law.

References

1972 births
21st-century Nigerian politicians
Living people
Peoples Democratic Party (Nigeria) politicians
University of Calabar alumni